Nootjärv is a lake in the northeast of Estonia, close to its border with Denmark and the coast of the Gulf of Finland.

See also
List of lakes of Estonia

Lakes of Estonia